MTV is a Portuguese pay television channel that was launched on 1 July 2003, replacing MTV Europe in Portugal. A high-definition simulcast feed of the channel launched on 17 June 2015.

In its initial stages MTV Portugal shared similar content to MTV Spain and MTV Italy, while also airing programming from MTV US and MTV Europe. There was a strong focus on music content but gradually the channel began to air reality shows similar to other MTV channels. The channel was launched in Portugal with the support of private broadcaster SIC as it previously had a MTV branded block in the early 1990s. The channel is based at MTV Networks Europe in London and supported by a local office is Lisbon.

In Spring 2011, MTV Portugal began to air new localised programming. The current MTV Portugal VJs are Diogo Dias – the first presenter of the channel, having hosted MTV Portugal since 2004 -, Luís Marvão and Patrícia Vieira. There are some Portuguese celebrities who also were MTV Portugal VJs: Filomena Cautela, Luísa Barbosa (in the second half of the 2000s) and Ana Sofia Martins (in the first half of the 2010s).

History
MTV Portugal was launched on July 3, 2003.

At the beginning, the channel broadcast mainly music, but gradually gave way to reality shows. Most of its programming consists of shows broadcast by MTV and MTV2 from the United States, but also shows from MTV UK (Geordie Shore, Just Tattoo of Us,...), MTV Spain (Gandía Shore,...) or MTV Brazil and  MTV LATAM.

VJ casting
In 2012, MTV Portugal aired a new local television program which aims to look for new VJs across the country. It began its search by going across the country to ten different cities across six months and selects its top candidates to progress to the next stage. During the VJ casting process it has visited Almada, Aveiro, Coimbra, Faro, Funchal, Guimarães, Lisbon, Montijo, Sintra, Viseu.

Local Programmes
MTV Amplifica (entertainment news update hosted by VJ Diogo)
MTV Breakfast Club (entertainment show hosted by VJ Patrícia and VJ Luís)
MTV News (available on MTV Portugal Instagram) 
MTV Hits (non-stop video show)
MTV Insomnia (non-stop video show)

Current Programs

 Ridiculousness
 MTV's Bugging Out
 Amplifica
 Awkward
 Geordie Shore
 Acapulco Shore
 Super Shore
 MTV #YouGotGot
 Faking It
 MTV Drive Time by smart
 Cribs
 MTV Dance Videos
 Car Crash Couples
 Video Love
 Catfish: The TV Show
 The Ride
 Are You the One?
 South Park
 Are You the One? Brazil
 I Used to be Fat
 MTV Insomnia
 MTV Breakfast Club
 Made
 MTV Movie Awards
 MTV Push
 MTV Video Music Award
 MTV World Stage
 Pimp My Ride
 MTV Retro
 Pranked
 Lip Sync Battle
 Teen Mom
 The Challenge
 MTV Summer Sessions
 The Ride
 Brothers Green: Eats
 MTV Suspect
 Ex on the Beach
 MTV Sunset Braga
 MTV It Girls
 The Hills
 MTV It Girls
 40 Greatest Pranks
 Daria
 Punk'd

References

External links

 

MTV channels
Television networks in Portugal
Television stations in Portugal
Television channels and stations established in 2003
2003 establishments in Portugal
Music organisations based in Portugal